Luna Online is a free-to-play massively multiplayer online role-playing video game developed by South Korean studio EYA Interactive. After a three-year development phase, starting in 2004, the game was initially launched in South Korea in 2007, but first became successful with its launch in Taiwan in October 2008.

The game's North American version, which was published by gPotato, was first announced on July 21, 2008, and received a closed beta that began on April 17, 2009, while an open beta started on May 14, 2009. An expansion pack, titled Luna Plus, that includes additional game areas and levels, as well as cosmetic items, was released on January 20, 2011.

Closure & Relaunch 
On March 27, 2012, gPotato shut down the servers for the North American versions of Luna Online and Prius Online.

On March 14, 2016, SubaGames launched a Kickstarter campaign to revive the game, ultimately raising C$16,987 to do so.  On April 1, 2016, the company relaunched the game via Steam, titling it "Luna Online: Reborn".

References 

2007 video games
Fantasy massively multiplayer online role-playing games
Inactive massively multiplayer online games
Video games developed in South Korea
Windows games
Windows-only games